Anthony P. D'Esposito (born February 22, 1982) is an American politician and retired police detective from New York. A member of the Republican Party, he has represented  in the United States House of Representatives since 2023. His victory in the 2022 midterm election was considered a major upset, contributing to the narrow Republican majority in the House of Representatives.

Police career
Before entering politics, D'Esposito was a police officer with the NYPD's 73rd Precinct Detective Squad, Military and Extended Leave Desk. He joined the NYPD in 2006 and worked there until retiring in 2020.

During his NYPD career, D'Esposito received four complaints of excessive force. For one of these complaints charges were recommended to be filed against D'Esposito He was also reprimanded twice by the department: in 2007, for working as a DJ and serving alcohol in a nightclub without departmental permission, for which was stripped of 15 vacation days; and in 2015, when he was docked 20 vacation days for failing to secure his firearm, which was stolen after he left it unattended in a car.  

As a member of NYPD, D'Esposito was named in three lawsuits in which plaintiffs accused him of violating their civil rights.  One case involved a 75 year old woman being chained to a bench in central booking and another woman passing out from her diabetes and having to be taken to a hospital.  This case was settled by New York City.  Another case which was filed, in which he was named a defendant, the plaintiff accused D'Esposito and other officers of illegally stopping and searching him without probable cause.  The suit claims the officers then took the plaintiff to the precinct station and strip searched and no contraband was found.  This case was settled by New York City.  In a third case against D'Esposito, the plaintiff alleges that D'Esposito lied to the Manhattan District Attorney and a grand jury.

Hempstead town council
D'Esposito was appointed as a councilman on the Hempstead, New York, town council in 2016, and won a full term the following year. He served on the council until 2023. 

During his tenure on the council, D'Esposito also accepted a job with the Nassau County Board of Elections that paid a salary of $100,000, which raised ethical concerns about potential conflicts of interest.

D'Esposito voted for a labor contract that protected his mother, brother and sister-in-law from being terminated.  This contract was later overturned by Nassau County Supreme Court judge Randy Sue Marber.  Marber stated that D'Esposito violated the "spirit and intent" of the towns ethics code and that the vote "lacked any semblance of rationality, and constituted an abuse of power.

U.S. House of Representatives

2022 campaign 

After winning the Republican 2022 primary election unopposed, D'Esposito faced former Hempstead town supervisor Laura Gillen in the general election. D'Esposito framed the race as a referendum on public safety and cost-of-living issues.

D'Esposito defeated Gillen with 51.8% of the vote. Some analysts attributed his victory to gubernatorial candidate Lee Zeldin's political coattails.

Tenure 
In January 2023, D'Esposito became the first sitting Republican representative to call for Representative George Santos' resignation in the wake of revelations about Santos' false biographical statements. D'Esposito's office has reportedly aided with services for a number of Santos' neighboring 3rd district constituents, who cannot reach or refuse to work with Santos' office. On March 7, 2023, D'Esposito introduced the No Fortune for Fraud Act, legislation that would alter House rules to prohibit members from being paid for their celebrity status if they are indicted for finance or fraud crimes; Santos, who is under investigation for fraud and check forgery in Brazil, is not directly named in the legislation, but D'Esposito said he was "an inspiration" for it.

D'Esposito supported Kevin McCarthy in the 2023 Speaker of the House election.

Personal life 
D'Esposito is of Italian and Puerto Rican ancestry.

See also

List of Hispanic and Latino Americans in the United States Congress

References

External links
 Congressman Anthony D'Esposito official U.S. House website
 Anthony D'Esposito for Congress

 

|-

1982 births
American people of Italian descent
Hispanic and Latino American members of the United States Congress
Hispanic and Latino American people in New York (state) politics
Living people
New York (state) city council members
New York (state) Republicans
Puerto Rican people in New York (state) politics
Republican Party members of the United States House of Representatives from New York (state)